Brzeg is a town in Opole Voivodeship, south-west Poland.

Brzeg may also refer to:

Brzeg Dolny, a town in Lower Silesian Voivodeship (south-west Poland)
Brzeg, Poddębice County in Łódź Voivodeship (central Poland)
Brzeg, Tomaszów Mazowiecki County in Łódź Voivodeship (central Poland)

See also
Brieg (disambiguation)